Dicymolomia julianalis, or Julia's dicymolomia moth, is a moth of the family Crambidae. It is found in most of eastern North America and on Cuba.

Diet 
The larvae have a diverse diet and have been recorded feeding on Astragalus canadensis and Cirsium lecontei. They have also been recorded as internal feeders in cattails (Typha species) and cactus stems (Opuntia species). Furthermore, they feed on senescent cotton bolls (Gossypium species) and are also known as predators on the eggs and larvae of Thyridopteryx ephemeraeformis.

References

Moths described in 1859
Glaphyriinae